Hippoglossina is a genus of large-tooth flounders native to the coastal Pacific waters of the Americas. A single species, H. oblonga is found along the Atlantic coast of United States and Canada, but it is frequently placed in Paralichthys instead of Hippoglossina.

Species
The currently recognized species in this genus are:
 Hippoglossina bollmani C. H. Gilbert, 1890 
 Hippoglossina macrops Steindachner, 1876 (bigeye flounder)
 Hippoglossina montemaris F. de Buen, 1961
 Hippoglossina mystacium Ginsburg, 1936
 Hippoglossina oblonga (Mitchill, 1815) (American fourspot flounder) – often placed in Paralichthys instead
 Hippoglossina stomata C. H. Eigenmann & R. S. Eigenmann, 1890 (bigmouth flounder)
 Hippoglossina tetrophthalma (C. H. Gilbert, 1890) (fourspot flounder)

References

Paralichthyidae
Marine fish genera
Taxa named by Franz Steindachner